Raman amplification  is based on the stimulated Raman scattering (SRS) phenomenon, when a lower frequency 'signal' photon induces the inelastic scattering of a higher-frequency 'pump' photon in an optical medium in the nonlinear regime. As a result of this, another 'signal' photon is produced, with the surplus energy resonantly passed to the vibrational states of the medium. This process, as with other stimulated emission processes, allows all-optical amplification. Optical fiber is today mostly used as the nonlinear medium for SRS, for telecom purposes; in this case it is characterized by a resonance frequency downshift of ~11 THz (corresponding to a wavelength shift at ~1550 nm of ~90 nm).  The SRS amplification process can be readily cascaded, thus accessing essentially any wavelength in the fiber low-loss guiding windows (both 1310 and 1550). In addition to applications in nonlinear and ultrafast optics, Raman amplification is used in optical telecommunications, allowing all-band wavelength coverage and in-line distributed signal amplification.

See also
Raman laser
C.V. Raman
Chirped pulse amplification
Regenerative amplification

References

Further reading

External links
"Raman Amplifiers", in the Encyclopedia of Laser Physics and Technology
"Simulation of Distributed Raman Amplification (DRA) for fiber-based transmission systems"

Raman scattering
Laser science
Scattering, absorption and radiative transfer (optics)
Fiber-optic communications